The St. Petersburg Union of Composers, (Soyuz Kompositorov- Russian: Союз композиторов) is a professional and creative musical association with its headquarters at the former mansion of the Princess Vera F. Gagarina at 45 Bolshaya Morskaya Street, St Petersburg, Russia. It is a Department of the Union of Composers of the Russian Federation, formerly the Union of Soviet Composers.

History
The St. Petersburg Union of Composers was founded in 1932. Amongst its members in its first decade of existence were established composers including B.V. Asafyev, V.M. Bogdanov-Berezovsky, A.P. Gladkovsky, V.M. Deshevovov, A.F. Pashchenko, Oles' Semyenovich Chishko, Y.A. Shaporin, D.D. Shostakovich, and young musicians B.A. Arapov, B.G. Holz, I.I. Dzerzhinsky, Y.V. Kochurov, V.V. Pushkov, G.N. Popov, V.P. Solovyev-Sedoy, M.I. Chulaki.

Chairmen of the Union have been: the musicologist B.A. Fingert, as first chairman; V.V. Shcherbachev (1935–37, 1944–48), I.O. Dunaevsky (1937–43), D.D. Shostakovich (1946–47), Chulaki (1947–48), Solovyev-Sedoy (1948–64), A.P. Petrov (1964-2006) and Grigory Korchmar (from 2006).

From 1964 for almost 30 years Andrei Petrov (died 2006) was the head of the St. Petersburg Union of Composers.

The Leningrad Department of the Union of Composers continued its work during the siege of 1941-44. In the 1960-80s, S.P. Banevich, G.I. Banshchikov, Veniamin Yefimovich Basner, V.A. Gavrilin, L.A. Desyatnikov, A.A. Kneifel, A.N. Kolker, S.M. Slonimsky, B.I. Tishchenko, V.A. Uspensky, G.I. Ustvolskaya, Y.A. Falik, I.I. Schwarz and A.B.Zatin became members of the Leningrad Department of the Union of Composers. Since 1964, the St. Petersburg Musical Spring festival has been held annually. Since 1989, the Children's Musical Festival has been organised which includes children's competitions: the Bruk and Taymanov memorial Competition of Piano Duets, Brother and Sister, and the Gavrilin Competition ‘I Am a Composer’.

In 2003 the Petersburg Department of the Union of Composers had more than 210 members.

Location
In the 1930s, the Leningrad Department of the Union of Composers was located at 2 Rossi Street. It moved in 1948 to its present location at 45 Bolshaya Morskaya Street, the former mansion of Princess V.F. Gagarina (who married the Romantic poet Pyotr Vyazemsky). This mansion was built in the 18th century, rebuilt in 1835-40 by architect Auguste de Montferrand and in 1873-74 by architect I.V. Strom and M.E. Messmacher. It also houses the Board of Directors, the Administration of the House of Composers, a concert hall, a cinema hall, musical and book libraries, a record library, a hotel and a publishing house Kompozitor.

References

Music organizations based in Russia
Culture in Saint Petersburg
Organizations based in Saint Petersburg